Harrison Chad is an American actor known for his roles in Broadway musicals, television, and film.

Early life and education 
Chad was born in New York City and started performing when he was six years old. He has performed in four Broadway shows: Peter Pan, Beauty and the Beast, Les Miserables, and he starred opposite Tonya Pinkins in Caroline, or Change. He graduated from Brown University in 2014.

Career 
His roles include young Tarzan in the film Tarzan 2, the original voice for Boots the Monkey on Dora the Explorer for the first four seasons from 2000–2007 and Go, Diego, Go!, the singing voice of Leo on Little Einsteins (2005–2009), and Cardigan from Charlotte's Web 2: Wilbur's Great Adventure. He also has performed live-action roles, including as the Comedy Central film Hebrew Hammer and the Showtime film Carry Me Home. He has guest starred on television, in Ed, Smash, Blue Bloods, Divorce, and Murphy Brown.

He received a 2004 Young Artist Awards nomination for his role as Boots, in the category "Best Performance in a Voice-Over Role – Young Actor".

He then went on to perform in the Kennedy Center production of Mame performing opposite Christine Baranski in 2006.

In 2013, he was in the Joe Iconis musical, The Black Suits at Center Theatre Group in Los Angeles. He also appeared in the workshop of The Black Suits  at the Barrington Stage Company in 2012.

Filmography

Film

Television

Video games

References

External links

Internet Broadway Database
Internet Off-Broadway Database

Living people
American male voice actors
American male child actors
American male stage actors
American male film actors
Male actors from New York City
Year of birth missing (living people)
Brown University alumni